Odysseus at the Court of Alcinous is an oil on canvas painting by Francesco Hayez, painted between 1814 and 1816 and now in the National Museum of Capodimonte in Naples. It was commissioned for Gioacchino Murat by Naples' interior minister Giuseppe Zurlo, using dimensions, price and subject specified by Hayez's patron and protector Leopoldo Cicognara, president of the Accademia di Venezia.

References

External links
Info
Art history

1816 paintings
Paintings in the collection of the Museo di Capodimonte
Odysseus
Cultural depictions of the Trojan War
Paintings based on the Odyssey
Paintings by Francesco Hayez
Joachim Murat